Scada is a genus of clearwing (ithomiine) butterflies, named by William Forsell Kirby in 1871. They are in the brush-footed butterfly family, Nymphalidae.

Species
Arranged alphabetically:
Scada karschina (Herbst, 1792)
Scada kusa (Hewitson, 1872)
Scada reckia (Hübner, [1808])
Scada zemira (Hewitson, 1856)
Scada zibia (Hewitson, 1856)

References

Ithomiini
Nymphalidae of South America
Nymphalidae genera
Taxa named by William Forsell Kirby